Valda (minor planet designation: 262 Valda) is a main belt asteroid that was discovered by Austrian astronomer Johann Palisa on 3 November 1886 in Vienna. The origin of the name is unknown.

Photometric observations of this asteroid from the Organ Mesa Observatory in Las Cruces, New Mexico, during 2010 gave a light curve with a period of 17.386 ± 0.001 hours and a brightness variation of 0.17 ± 0.02 magnitude.

References

External links
 The Asteroid Orbital Elements Database
 Minor Planet Discovery Circumstances
 
 

Background asteroids
Valda
Valda
S-type asteroids (Tholen)
18861103